Urumi is an extinct Tupian language of the state of Rondônia, in the Amazon region of Brazil.

References

Tupian languages
Extinct languages of South America
Mamoré–Guaporé linguistic area